Smithycroft Secondary School is located in Riddrie, Glasgow, Scotland. Its buildings are sited to the immediate north-west of HMP Barlinnie. In 2002 the school relocated to a new building constructed in the playing fields of the old school. The original facility was formally opened in 1967 by William Ross M.B.E MP, Secretary of State for Scotland. The Headteacher role changed after Jean Miller moved on to a higher role and in came Patrick Oberg.

Sports 
Rugby
The school has participated in Rugby League championships across the UK for the last 6 years. Pupils have also participated in rugby exchanges and tours to Spain, France, and Australia. A number of old Smithonians have been selected to go on to play for the Scotland Rugby team.

Athletics
Smithycroft has produced several national and international level athletes, most prominently Andrew Dearie and Nicky Stone. Dearie represented Scotland at the 2009 Schools International match finishing 3rd and also at the 2009 UK School Games in Cardiff
Former pupil Nicky Stone also represented Scotland on behalf of the school at both the Schools International Athletics matches in 2009 and 2010 and also the 2010 UK School Games in Gateshead where he won Bronze in the boys Hammer Throw

Rowing
In 2009/10 Smithycroft School pupil Lauren Vidler was chosen to row for both Glasgow Schools and Clydesdale Rowing Club(where three pupils currently train). She has since continued Rowing at University level and currently rows for the University of Edinburgh team and Castle Semple Rowing Club during summer time. All of this was possible due to the support and link between Smithycroft and Scottish Rowing.

Smithycroft is now also home to The Glasgow International Volleyball Club.

Awards and achievements 

Smithycroft School was recognised for Achievement in International Education in March 2009. This was due to its Comenius Project which created links with partner schools in Sweden, France, Germany, Spain, Turkey and Poland.

Student Exchanges are available to students who wish to learn at and visit any one of these schools.

References

External links
Official website

Secondary schools in Glasgow
1967 establishments in Scotland
Educational institutions established in 1967